Jarmo Manninen (born 11 March 1951) is a Finnish former footballer. He capped eight times for the Finland national team.

International goals

Career honors 
Finnish Championship: 1975

References 

1951 births
Finnish footballers
Turun Palloseura footballers
FC Jazz players
Sportspeople from Pori
Living people
Association football forwards
Finland international footballers
Ässät football players